{{Automatic taxobox
|image = Pseudorimula midatlantica (MNHN-IM-2000-4786).jpeg
|image_caption = Shell of Pseudorimula midatlantica 
|taxon = Pseudorimula
|authority = McLean, 1989<ref>McLean (1989). Contrib. Sci. (Los Ang.) 407: 22.</ref>
|synonyms_ref = 
|synonyms =
 Pseudoraphitoma (Incorrect spelling)
 Turrella Laseron, 1954
| type_species = Pseudorimula marianae McLean, 1989
| display_parents = 3
}}Pseudorimula is a genus of sea snails, marine gastropod mollusks in the family Lepetodrilidae.

Species
Species within the genus Pseudorimula include:
 Pseudorimula marianae McLean, 1989
 Pseudorimula midatlantica'' McLean, 1992

References

External links
 McLean, J.H. (1989). New slit-limpets (Scissurellacea and Fissurellacea) from hydrothermal vents. Part 1: Systematic descriptions and comparisons based on shell and radular characters. Contributions in Science, Natural History Museum of Los Angeles County. 407: 1–29

Lepetodrilidae